Top Chef Duels is an American reality competition series which premiered on August 6, 2014, on Bravo. The culinary show is one of the several spin-off series of the popular cooking competition show Top Chef aired on the same network. Announced in January 2014 as Top Chef Extreme, the series features eighteen contestants who have previously competed in Top Chef and Top Chef Masters. During each episode, two of the contestants face each other in various culinary tasks. The winner is picked at the end of an episode to compete in the championship finale. The series is hosted by Curtis Stone. Besides hosting, Stone is also a judge together with Gail Simmons, while Wolfgang Puck, Hugh Acheson and other celebrity guest judges make numerous appearances throughout the series.

CJ Jacobson won the series and was awarded $100,000, and an opportunity to appear on the Food & Wine magazine.

Episodes 
Winners are listed in bold

References

External links 

 
 
 

Duels
Bravo (American TV network) original programming
2010s American cooking television series
2014 American television series debuts
2014 American television series endings
English-language television shows
Television series by Magical Elves
Reality television spin-offs
American television spin-offs